The Medard W. Welch Award is given to scientists who demonstrated outstanding research in the fields pertinent to American Vacuum Society. It was established in 1969 in memory of Medard W. Welch, a founder of the American Vacuum Society.

List of recipients

See also

 List of physics awards

References

Physics awards